Richard D. Lines (April 21, 1916 – June 29, 1992) was an American amateur astronomer. He started as a deep-sky observer and photographer, but later specialized in photometry of variable stars. He was a member of the American Association of Variable Star Observers and International Amateur-Professional Photoelectric Photometry (I.A.P.P.P.). Together with his wife Helen Chambliss Lines, also a keen astronomer, he built a small observatory in Mayer, Arizona. In 1962 he co-discovered the comet Seki-Lines. In 1992 he and his wife won the Amateur Achievement Award of the Astronomical Society of the Pacific for their work in the field of photoelectric photometry of variable stars. Short time after he was awarded, Richard Lines died. In 1994 the I.A.P.P.P. announced that its annual Special Award in Astronomy would carry his name as the Richard D. Lines Special Award in Astronomy.

References
The I.A.P.P.P. Richard D. Lines Special Award in Astronomy, International Amateur-Professional Photoelectric Photometry Communication, No. 57, p. 63
Saguaro Astronomy Club: The Passing of Richard Lines 
Comet Hunter Seki's Webpage
I.A.P.P.P.: the Richard D. Lines Award
Amateur Achievement Award winners

1992 deaths
Amateur astronomers
20th-century American astronomers
Discoverers of comets
1916 births